Candelaria is a genus of lichen-forming fungi in the family Candelariaceae. The genus was circumscribed by Italian lichenologist Abramo Bartolommeo Massalongo in 1852.

Species
, Species Fungorum accepts 5 species of Candelaria:
Candelaria asiatica  – South Korea
Candelaria concolor 
Candelaria crawfordii 
Candelaria fibrosoides  – Peru
Candelaria pacifica  – Europe; North America; South America

References

Candelariales
Ascomycota genera
Lichen genera
Taxa named by Abramo Bartolommeo Massalongo
Taxa described in 1852